Stanley Edward Dreben (July 10, 1918 – February 16, 1980) was an American screenwriter.

Born in New York. Dreben began his career in 1956, first writing for the variety television series The Martha Raye Show. He then wrote episodes for television programs such as McHale's Navy, The Andy Griffith Show, Get Smart, The Paul Lynde Show, The Red Skelton Hour, The Danny Thomas Show, Green Acres, Love, American Style, The Flying Nun, Petticoat Junction, The Joey Bishop Show and F Troop. Dreben had written several episodes for The Tonight Show Starring Johnny Carson. His last screenwriting credit was from The Facts of Life.

Dreben died in February 1980 at his home in Northridge, California, at the age of 61.

References

External links 

1918 births
1980 deaths
Screenwriters from New York (state)
American male screenwriters
American television writers
American male television writers
20th-century American screenwriters
American comedy writers